The Tuareg languages constitute a group of closely related Berber languages and dialects. They are spoken by the Tuareg Berbers in large parts of Mali, Niger, Algeria, Libya and Burkina Faso, with a few speakers, the Kinnin, in Chad.

Description
Tuareg dialects belong to the South Berber group and are sometimes regarded as a single language (as for instance by Karl-Gottfried Prasse). They are distinguished mainly by a few sound shifts (notably affecting the pronunciation of original z and h). The Tuareg varieties are unusually conservative in some respects; they retain two short vowels where Northern-Berber languages have one or none, and have a much lower proportion of Arabic loanwords than most Berber languages.

The Tuareg languages are traditionally written in the indigenous Tifinagh alphabet. However, the Arabic script is commonly used in some areas (and has been since medieval times), while the Latin script is official in Mali and Niger.

Subclassification
Northern
Tamahaq – language of the Kel Ahaggar, and Kel Ajjer spoken in Algeria, western Libya and in the north of Niger by around 77,000 people. Also known as Tahaggart.
Southern
Tamasheq – language of the Kel Adrar (also known as Adrar des Ifoghas), spoken in Mali by approximately 500,000 people.
Air Tamajaq – language of the Kel Ayer (sometimes spelled Aïr), spoken in Niger by approximately 250,000 people.
Tawellemet – language of the Iwellemmeden, spoken in Mali and Niger by approximately 800,000 people. The term Iwellemmeden (the name of the people) is sometimes used to denote the language.
Tamashaq language of Kal Asakan.

Blench (ms, 2006) lists the following as separate languages, with dialects in parentheses:
Tawellemet (Abalagh/East, West)
Tayiṛt (Ingal, Gofat)
Tamesgrest (Azerori)
Tafaghist
Tahaggart/Ahaggar
Ghat

Speakers of Tin Sert (Tetserret) identify as Tuareg, but the language is Western Berber.

Orthography
The Tuareg languages may be written using the ancient Tifinagh (Libyco-Berber) script, the Latin script or the Arabic script. The Malian national literacy program DNAFLA has established a standard for the Latin alphabet, which is used with modifications in Prasse's Lexique and the government literacy program in Burkina, while in Niger a different system was used. There is also some variation in Tifinagh and in the Arabic script.

Early uses of the Tifinagh script have been found on rock art and in various sepulchres. Among these are the 1,500 year old monumental tomb of the Tuareg matriarch Tin Hinan, where vestiges of a Tifinagh inscription have been found on one of its walls.

Tifinagh usage is now restricted mainly to writing magical formulae, writing on palms when silence is required, and in letter-writing. The Arabic script is mostly in use by tribes more involved in Islamic learning, and little is known about its conventions.

The DNAFLA system is a somewhat morphophonemic orthography, not indicating initial vowel shortening, always writing the directional particle as < dd⟩, and not indicating all assimilations (e.g.  for [tămašăq]).

In Burkina Faso the emphatics are denoted by "hooked" letters, as in Fula, e.g. .

Phonology

Vowels
The vowel system includes five long vowels,  and two short vowels,  (on this page,  is used to represent IPA ). Some of the vowels have more open "emphatic" allophones that occur immediately before emphatic consonants, subject to dialectal variation. Karl Prasse argued that /e/ goes back to Proto-Berber, while /o/ is derived from /u/. Comparative evidence shows that /ə/ derives from a merger of Proto-Berber */ĭ/ and */ŭ/.

Sudlow classes the "semivowels" /w, j/ with the vowels, and notes the following possible diphthongs: /əw/ (> [u]), /ăw/, /aw/, /ew/, /iw/, /ow/, /uw/, /əj/ (> [i]), /ăj/, /aj/, /ej/, /ij/, /oj/, /uj/.

Consonants

The consonant inventory largely resembles Arabic: differentiated voicing; uvulars, pharyngeals (traditionally referred to as emphatics) ; requiring the pharynx muscles to contract and influencing the pronunciation of the following vowel (although  only occur in Arabic loans and  only in the name of Allah).

The glottal stop is non-phonemic. It occurs at the beginning of vowel-initial words to fill the place of the initial consonant in the syllable structure (see below), although if the words is preceded by a word ending in a consonant, it makes a liaison instead. Phrase-final /a/ is also followed by a phonetic glottal stop.

Gemination is contrastive. In addition, in Tadraq  is usually geminate, but in Tudalt singleton  may occur.

Voicing assimilation occurs, with the first consonant taking the voicing of the second (e.g.  > ).

Cluster reduction turns word/morpheme-final  into  and  into  (e.g.  >  'Tamasheq').

Phonotactics
Syllable structure is CV(C)(C), including glottal stops (see above).

Suprasegmentals
Contrastive stress may occur in the stative aspect of verbs.

Dialectal differences

Different dialects have slightly different consonant inventories. Some of these differences can be diachronically accounted for. For example, Proto-Berber *h is mostly lost in Ayer Tuareg, while it is maintained in almost every position in Mali Tuareg. The Iwellemmeden and Ahaggar Tuareg dialects are midway between these positions. The Proto-Berber consonant *z comes out differently in different dialects, a development that is to some degree reflected in the dialect names. It is realized as h in Tamahaq (Tahaggart), as š in Tamasheq and as simple z in the Tamajaq dialects Tawallammat and Tayart. In the latter two, *z is realised as ž before palatal vowels, explaining the form Tamajaq. In Tawallammat and especially Tayart, this kind of palatalization actually does not confine itself to z. For example, tidət is pronounced  in Tayart.

Other differences can easily be traced back to borrowing. For example, the Arabic pharyngeals ħ and ʻ have been borrowed along with Arabic loanwords by dialects specialized in Islamic (Maraboutic) learning. Other dialects substitute ħ and ʻ respectively with x and ɣ.

Grammar

The basic word order in Tuareg is verb–subject–object. Verbs can be grouped into 19 morphological classes; some of these classes can be defined semantically. Verbs carry information on the subject of the sentence in the form of pronominal marking. No simple adjectives exist in the Tuareg languages; adjectival concepts are expressed using a relative verb form traditionally called 'participle'. The Tuareg languages have very heavily influenced Northern Songhay languages such as Sawaq, whose speakers are culturally Tuareg but speak Songhay; this influence includes points of phonology and sometimes grammar as well as extensive loanwords.

Syntax
Tamasheq prefers VSO order; however it contains topic–comment structure (like in American Sign Language, Modern Hebrew, Japanese and Russian), allowing the emphasized concept to be placed first, be it the subject or object, the latter giving an effect somewhat like the English passive. Sudlow uses the following examples, all expressing the concept “Men don’t cook porridge” (e denotes Sudlow's schwa):

Again like Japanese, the “pronoun/particle ‘a’ is used with a following relative clause to bring a noun in a phrase to the beginning for emphasis,” a structure which can be used to emphasize even objects of prepositions. Sudlow’s example (s denotes voiceless palato-alveolar fricative):

The indirect object marker takes the form i/y in Tudalt and e/y in Tadraq.

Morphology

As a root-and-pattern, or templatic language, triliteral roots (three-consonant bases) are the most common in Tamasheq. Niels and Regula Christiansen use the root k-t-b (to write) to demonstrate past completed aspect conjugation:

The verbal correspondence with the use of aspect; Tamasheq uses four, as delineated by Sudlow:

 Perfective: complete actions
 Stative: "lasting states as the ongoing results of a completed action."
 Imperfective: future or possible actions, "often used following a verb expressing emotion, decision or thought," it can be marked with "'ad'" (shortened to "'a-'" with prepositions).
 Cursive: ongoing actions, often habitual ones.

Commands are expressed in the imperative mood, which tends to be a form of the imperfective aspect, unless the action is to be repeated or continued, in which case the cursive aspect is preferred.

Further reading

Bibliographies
Bougchiche, Lamara. (1997) Langues et litteratures berberes des origines a nos jours. Bibliographie internationale et systematique. Paris: Ibis Press.
Chaker, Salem, ed. (1988) Etudes touaregues. Bilan des recherches en sciences sociales. Travaux et Documents de i.R.E.M.A.M. no. 5. Aix-en-Provence: IREMAM / LAPMO.
Leupen, A.H.A. (1978) Bibliographie des populations touaregues: Sahara et Soudan centraux. Leiden: Afrika Studiecentrum.

Dictionaries

Charles de Foucauld (1951–1952) Dictionnaire touareg–francais. 4 vol. Paris: Imprimerie Nationale de France. [posthumous facsimile publication (author dec. 1916); dialect of Hoggar, southern Algeria]
 Jeffrey Heath (2006) Dictionnaire tamachek–anglais–français. Paris: Karthala. [covers dialects of northern Mali]
 Motylinski, A. (1908). Grammaire, dialogues et dictionnaire touaregs. Alger: P. Fontana.
Karl-G Prasse, Ghoubeid Alojaly and Ghabdouane Mohamed, (2003) Dictionnaire touareg–francais (Niger). 2nd edition revised; 2 vol. Copenhagen: Museum Tusculanum Press, University of Copenhagen. [1st edition 1998; covers two dialects of the northern Republic of Niger]

Grammars
Christiansen, Niels, and Regula. "Some verb morphology features of Tadaksahak ." SIL Electronic Working Papers. 2002. SIL International. 2 December 2007 <>.
 Hanoteau, A. (1896) Essai de grammaire de la langue tamachek' : renfermant les principes du langage parlé par les Imouchar' ou Touareg. Alger: A. Jourdan.
Galand, Lionel. (1974) 'Introduction grammaticale'. In: Petites Soeurs de Jesus, Contes touaregs de l'Air (Paris: SELAF), pp. 15–41.
 Heath, Jeffrey. 2005. Grammar of Tamashek (Tuareg of Mali). (Mouton Grammar Series.) the Hague: Mouton de Gruyter.

Prasse, Karl G. (1973) Manuel de grammaire touaregue (tahaggart). 4 vol. Copenhagen.

Texts
 Ag Erless, Mohamed (1999) "Il n'y a qu'un soleil sur terre". Contes, proverbes et devinettes des Touaregs Kel-Adagh. Aix-en-Provence: IREMAM.
 Aghali-Zakara, Mohamed & Jeannine Drouin (1979) Traditions touarègues nigériennes. Paris: L'Harmattan.
 Albaka, Moussa & Dominique Casajus (1992) Poésies et chant touaregs de l'Ayr. Tandis qu'ils dorment tous, je dis mon chant d'amour. Paris: L'Harmattan.
 Alojaly, Ghoubeïd (1975) Ǎttarikh ən-Kəl-Dənnəg – Histoire des Kel-Denneg. Copenhagen: Akademisk Forlag.
 Casajus, Dominique (1985) Peau d'Âne et autres contes touaregs. Paris: L'Harmattan.
 Chaker, Salem & Hélène Claudot & Marceau Gast, eds. (1984) Textes touaregs en prose de Charles de Foucauld et. A. de Calassanto-Motylinski. Aix-en-Provence: Édisud.
  Chants touaregs. Recueillis et traduits par Charles de Foucauld. Paris, Albin Michel, 1997
 Foucauld, Charles de (1925) Poésies touarègues. Dialecte de l'Ahaggar. Paris: Leroux.
 Lettres au marabout. Messages touaregs au Père de Foucauld. Paris, Belin, 1999
 Heath, Jeffrey (2005) Tamashek Texts from Timbuktu and Kidal. Berber Linguistics Series. Cologne: Koeppe Verlag
 Louali-Raynal, Naïma & Nadine Decourt & Ramada Elghamis (1997) Littérature orale touarègue. Contes et proverbes. Paris: L'Harmattan.
 Mohamed, Ghabdouane & Karl-G. Prasse (1989) Poèmes touarègues de l'Ayr. 2 vol. Copenhagen: Akademisk Forlag.
 Mohamed, Ghabdouane & Karl-G. Prasse (2003) əlqissǎt ən-təməddurt-in – Le récit de ma vie. Copenhagen: Museum Tusculanum Press.
Nicolaisen, Johannes, and Ida Nicolaisen. The Pastoral Tuareg: Ecology, Culture, and Society. Vol. 1,2. New York: Thames and Hudson, Inc, 1997. 2 vols.
 Nicolas, Francis (1944) Folklore Twareg. Poésies et Chansons de l'Azawarh. BIFAN VI, 1–4, p. 1-463.

Linguistic topics
 Cohen, David (1993) 'Racines'. In: Drouin & Roth, eds. À la croisée des études libyco-berbères. Mélanges offerts à Paulette Galand-Pernet et Lionel Galand (Paris: Geuthner), 161–175.
 Kossmann, Maarten (1999) Essai sur la phonologie du proto-berbère. Köln: Rüdiger Köppe.
 Prasse, Karl G. (1969) A propos de l'origine de h touareg (tahaggart). Copenhagen.

References

Bibliography

External links
Souag, L.: Writing Berber Languages

 
Berber languages
Languages of Algeria